McClarnon is a surname. Notable people with the surname include:

Liz McClarnon (born 1981), English singer and television presenter
Zahn McClarnon (born 1966), American actor

See also
McLarnon